Close is a 2019 British action thriller film directed by Vicky Jewson and starring Noomi Rapace. Rapace's character is based on that of Jacquie Davis, one of the world's leading female bodyguards, whose clients have included J. K. Rowling, Nicole Kidman and members of the British royal family. The film was released on 18 January 2019 by Netflix.

Plot
While in South Sudan on a routine mission, close protection officer Sam Carlson saves two journalists she is protecting when their vehicle is attacked by local insurgents.

Zoe Tanner, the troubled child and heir of recently deceased business tycoon Eric Tanner, discovers she has been left all of her father's shares in his company, Hassine Mining. This shocks and angers her stepmother, Rima Hassine, whose family founded the company and who has taken over Eric's position as CEO. Having succeeded in negotiating a billion dollar deal for phosphate mining in Zambia, Rima demands that Zoe accompany her to the family house in Morocco while she completes the deal.

Rima hires Sam to act as Zoe's bodyguard for the trip, as her previous male bodyguard was fired for having sex with Zoe. Upon arriving at the family's fortified kasbah, Zoe demands that Sam remain for the full time she has been paid, and stay the night. Later that evening the safehouse's security system is breached, locking the property down and trapping its inhabitants. Heavily armed intruders kill multiple members of the security team. The intruders make their way to Zoe's room, killing en route the head of security, Alik.

Zoe escapes with Sam, and they are picked up by responding police officers. Although the officers assure them they are being taken to a police station, Zoe (who speaks Arabic) overhears them discussing a private address and money. Sam fights and disarms the officers, but Zoe ends up shooting one of them with Sam's sidearm. The two escape on foot into Casablanca and take refuge in a hotel. News of the incident causes share prices in Hassine Mining to drop considerably, potentially enabling their competitor Sikong to steal the deal.

Sam promises to get Zoe out of the country and is later joined by her boss and former lover, Conall. Their escape plan is for the three of them to travel as a family to Tangier and take the ferry to Spain. They are ambushed at the hotel by men who kill Conall. Sam saves Zoe from being taken by brutally fighting and killing two of the men.

Unable to leave the country without passports, Sam and Zoe travel to Hassine Mining headquarters to meet Rima. There they witness her in the car park with one of the suspicious men from the hotel. They follow him to a local marina, but Sam is noticed and the two fight; Sam impales him with a large fishing hook. Looking through his wallet, Sam and Zoe discover he is a police officer and had Rima's login details for the house security system.

While meeting with the selling company, Rima is confronted by a member of the competitor Sikong, who makes further threats on Zoe. Sam and Zoe return to the abandoned safehouse, where Zoe discovers that Sam previously had a child whom she put up for adoption at 16. During a meeting to finalize the mining deal, Rima receives a notification that her phone has been accessed by the house security system, and she leaves without signing the mining deal. The house is surrounded by corrupt members of the police, who refuse to allow a detective from Casablanca working with Rima to enter.

Rima arrives by helicopter. She reveals to Zoe that she is being blackmailed and that she is not responsible for the attempts on her life. She is attacked by the mercenaries and corrupt officers, although Zoe and Sam intervene and eventually save her. Sam is wounded in the wrist. With Zoe and Rima safe, and the threat over, Sam leaves to head home but promises Zoe she will call her daughter.

Cast
 Noomi Rapace as Sam Carlson, a close protection officer (CPO) assigned to protect Zoe
 Sophie Nélisse as Zoe Tanner, the heiress to Hassine Mining and Rima's stepdaughter 
 Indira Varma as Rima Hassine, the CEO of Hassine Mining and Zoe's stepmother. 
 Eoin Macken as Conall Sinclair, Sam's superior and friend
 Akin Gazi as Alik, the head of security for Hassine Mining
 Mansour Badri as Damari, a corrupt senior Morocco National Police officer
 Abdesslam Bouhssini as Zuberi, a Morocco National Police detective working for Rima
 George Georgiou as Nabil, the leader of a group of mercenaries
 Kevin Shen as Watt Li, the Deputy CEO of Sikong Mining
 Mimi Keene as Claire

Production
Principal photography began in August 2017 and filming took place at Pinewood and on location in London, Casablanca and Marrakesh. The film was pre-sold by Westend Films to 11 territories at script stage in 2017. In 2018, Netflix acquired the distribution rights for the film.

Release
The trailer was released on 3 January 2019, the film was released on 18 January 2019 by Netflix.

Reception 
The critical consensus reads, "Close puts a welcome female-fronted spin on the prototypical action thriller; unfortunately, the rest of the movie's ingredients are tediously predictable." Metacritic rated it 51/100 based on eight reviews, indicating "mixed or average reviews".

References

External links
 

2019 films
English-language Netflix original films
American action thriller films
Films about bodyguards
Films set in the 21st century
Films shot in Morocco
Films shot in the United Kingdom
British action thriller films
2010s English-language films
2010s American films
2010s British films